Merry or Merrie Monarch may refer to:
Charles II of England (1630–1685), king of Great Britain and Ireland
Kalākaua (1836–1891), king of Hawaii
Merrie Monarch Festival
The Merry Monarch, racehorse
The Merry Monarch (musical), an 1890 comic opera